Hachirō, Hachiro, Hachiroh or Hachirou is a masculine Japanese given name. Notable people with the name include:

, Japanese water polo player
, Japanese politician
, Japanese singer
, Japanese baseball player
, Japanese politician
, Japanese rower

Japanese masculine given names